Johnny Johnson, Jr. (born June 11, 1968) is an American former professional football  player who was a running back in the National Football League (NFL) for the New York Jets and the Phoenix Cardinals between 1990 and 1994.

High school and college
He prepped at Santa Cruz High School. Johnson attended and graduated from San Jose State University. For the San Jose State Spartans basketball team, Johnson played 12 games as a basketball player after most team members walked off and refused to play under coach Bill Berry. With 1,219 yards rushing and 61 catches in receiving, Johnson was considered among the top 20 college football players in the United States in 1988. After five games into his senior season, Johnson was dismissed from the team for missing practices and team meetings. Johnson's reasoning for missing practices was to help take care of his mother in the aftermath of the 1989 Loma Prieta earthquake, but because telephone lines were down across the area, there wasn't much of a way for Johnson to communicate to his head coach Claude Gilbert. Gilbert however claimed that Johnson had already skipped 2 o'clock practice anyway to attend game 3 of the 1989 World Series. Nevertheless, his dismissal from the Spartans football program dropped Johnson's draft stock all the way to the 169th pick in the 1990 NFL Draft by the Phoenix Cardinals.

Professional career

Johnson played in the 1991 Pro Bowl.  After playing for three seasons for the Cardinals, he was traded during the 1993 NFL Draft to the New York Jets, in exchange for the Cardinals moving from the number 4 pick in the draft to the Jets' number 3 draft position.  The Cardinals badly wanted Garrison Hearst, who also played running back, so the Cardinals were willing to part with Johnson just to move up one draft spot.

After arriving on the Jets, Johnny Johnson was named Jets team MVP in 1993 in a vote by his teammates.  Johnson finished the season ranked second in the AFC in total yards from scrimmage. He was one of only two backs to lead his team in rushing and receptions.

He became a free agent in 1995, and the Jets made him available for the expansion draft that year.  Johnson considered signing with the San Francisco 49ers. In April 1996, Johnson signed a two-year, $3-million contract with the 49ers; consequently, the 49ers waived Dennis Brown to make salary cap room for Johnson.

NFL career statistics

Notes

1968 births
Living people
African-American players of American football
American football running backs
National Conference Pro Bowl players
New York Jets players
Sportspeople from Santa Clara, California
Sportspeople from Santa Cruz, California
Phoenix Cardinals players
Players of American football from California
San Francisco 49ers players
San Jose State Spartans football players
San Jose State Spartans men's basketball players
American men's basketball players
Santa Cruz High School alumni
21st-century African-American people
20th-century African-American sportspeople